Danny Russell (born 24 December 1969) is a former rugby league footballer who played in the 1990s and 2000s.

International honours
Russell won caps for Scotland while at Carlisle, and Huddersfield 1996...2000 9-caps.

References

External links
The Teams: Scotland
 Scots hit by withdrawals
 Tigers in romp over Giants
 We're Scots and we're proud
 An unwanted treble

1969 births
Living people
Australian people of Scottish descent
Australian rugby league players
Carlisle RLFC players
Huddersfield Giants players
Manly Warringah Sea Eagles players
Rugby league hookers
Scotland national rugby league team captains
Scotland national rugby league team players